Happy Planet is the fourth and final studio album by American rock band Wall of Voodoo, released in 1987. It marked the return of producer Richard Mazda, who had produced their 1982 album Call of the West.

Although not as successful as Call of the West, Happy Planet did produce a minor hit with a cover of the Beach Boys' "Do It Again". The album, recorded at Hit City West, reached No. 83 on the Australian charts.

Brian Wilson connections
"Do It Again" is a cover of the Beach Boys' 1968 song, and its music video featured a guest appearance from Beach Boys leader and co-founder Brian Wilson. In the video, he plays an orderly in a psychiatric hospital who falls asleep and wakes up to the members of Wall of Voodoo dressed as members of the Mafia. Wilson, in real life, was admitted to psychiatric hospitals at least three times. The cover of the "Do It Again" single included photos of the band with Wilson. He is also referenced in the lyrics to "Chains of Luck" in the line, "Brian Wilson chants his mantra, 'Da doo ron ron, da doo ron ron'," a reference to Wilson's obsession with the work of music producer Phil Spector.

Track listing
Side one
 "Do It Again" (Brian Wilson, Mike Love) – 3:18
 "Hollywood the Second Time" (Andy Prieboy) – 4:06
 "Empty Room" (Bruce Moreland) – 3:53
 "Chains of Luck" (Chas T. Gray, Ned Leukhardt, Prieboy) – 3:55
 "Back in the Laundromat" (Prieboy) – 3:20 [CD only bonus track]
 "When the Lights Go Out" (Marc Moreland, Prieboy) – 3:19

Side two
 "Country of Man" (M. Moreland) – 3:29
 "Joanne" (Prieboy) – 3:40
 "Elvis Bought Dora a Cadillac" (M. Moreland, Prieboy) – 3:42
 "The Grass Is Greener" (Gray, Leukhardt, M. Moreland, Prieboy) – 3:40
 "Ain't My Day" (M. Moreland) – 4:38

In 2012, the album was remastered and re-released by Australian reissue label Raven Records as part of a double CD set with previous album Seven Days in Sammystown, live album The Ugly Americans in Australia and three non-album bonus tracks.

Personnel
Wall of Voodoo
Andy Prieboy – vocals, keyboards, piano
Marc Moreland – guitar
Bruce Moreland – bass guitar
Chas T. Gray – keyboards, vocals
Ned Leukhardt – drums, percussion, machines

Additional musicians
Jeff Rymes – additional vocals
Randy Weeks – additional vocals
Lyn Todd – additional vocals
Yolanda Pittman – additional vocals
Bill Pittman – bass ("Country of Man")

Technical
Richard Mazda – producer, co-arranger, various instruments and vocals
Peter Kelsey – engineer
Stephen Sayadian – cover concept and design
Wall of Voodoo – co-arrangers, design layout
Steve Hall – mastering
Ladi Von Jansky – photography
Ron Scarselli – design layout
Belinda Williams Sayadian – styling

Charts

References

Wall of Voodoo albums
1987 albums
I.R.S. Records albums
Albums produced by Richard Mazda